Arnaud Randrianantenaina (born 3 January 2001) is a Malagasy footballer who plays as a forward for Egyptian Premier League side El Gouna  and the Madagascar national team.

Club career
Randrianantenaina spent 2017 at Ajesaia before he was recruited by the CNaPS Sport coaching staff, who brought him to the team for the 2018 season at the age of 17. That year, he helped them to a league title and experienced continental football by playing in the qualifying rounds of the 2018–19 CAF Champions League against Zimbabwean champions F.C. Platinum.

Randrianantenaina trialled with French side Grenoble Foot 38 in January 2020, but "administrative issues" prevented the deal from finalizing on the eve of the winter transfer window. Ajesaia and CNaPS Sport had a dispute over his rights, and neither team signed off on the deal he was offered. He later signed with JS Saint-Pierroise of the Réunion Premier League in February 2021.

International career

Youth
Randrianantenaina represented the national under-20 team at the 2019 COSAFA U-20 Cup and the 2020 Arab Cup U-20, scoring prolifically in both competitions.

Senior
Randrianantenaina made his senior international debut on 28 July 2019, providing the lone goal in their 1–0 home victory over Mozambique in the first leg of their 2020 African Nations Championship qualification tie. He scored the game-winner in stoppage time after coming on as a second-half substitute for Jean-Claude Marobe. A week later in the away leg, he scored again just a few minutes after coming on for Lovanirina Randriamiharisoa. Madagascar lost 3–2 but advanced on away goals. Randrianantenaina played in both legs against Namibia in the next round, but they did not progress. He also appeared in a 2021 Africa Cup of Nations qualifier.

Career statistics

International

International goals
Scores and results list Madagascar's goal tally first.

Honours

Club
CNaPS Sport
 Malagasy Pro League: 2018

References

External links
 
 
 Profile at madagascar-football.com

Living people
2001 births
Malagasy footballers
Madagascar international footballers
Madagascar under-20 international footballers
Association football forwards
Ajesaia players
CNaPS Sport players
JS Saint-Pierroise players
Malagasy expatriate footballers
Malagasy expatriate sportspeople in Réunion
Expatriate footballers in Réunion
People from Antananarivo